Kees van der Ven (born 1956/57) is a Dutch former professional motocross racer and team manager.

Van der Ven was one of the top competitors in the F.I.M. motocross world championships in the 1980s, winning 17 Grand Prix motocross races in the 125cc, 250cc and 500cc classes. A specialist on sand tracks, he won five consecutive times at the Le Touquet beach race between 1982 and 1986. He placed in the top three in the 250cc motocross world championship for four consecutive years between 1980 and 1983.

In 1984 he switched to the 125 class and finished in third place, and in 1987 he finished in third place in the 500 class. He rode most of his career for the KTM factory. Van der Ven also competed in enduro events and was a member of the winning Dutch team at the 1984 International Six Days Enduro.

After his riding career ended, he became a successful team manager for KTM, winning the 2000 125 world championship with Grant Langston as his rider.

References

External links
 Kees van der Ven profile

Year of birth missing (living people)
Living people
Dutch motocross riders
Enduro riders
People from Gemert-Bakel
Sportspeople from North Brabant
20th-century Dutch people